Sydney Darvell  (17 May 1874 – 22 June 1944) was a Welsh international footballer. He was part of the Wales national football team, playing 2 matches. He played his first match on 6 March 1897 against Ireland and his last match on 20 March 1897 against Scotland.

See also
 List of Wales international footballers (alphabetical)

References

External links
 

1874 births
1944 deaths
Welsh footballers
Wales international footballers
Place of birth missing
Association football defenders
Oxford University A.F.C. players